Events from the year 1531 in art.

Events

Works

 Albrecht Altdorfer – The Pride of the Beggar Sitting on the Train
 Correggio – Leda and the Swan
 Lucas Cranach the Elder – Cupid complaining to Venus (The honey thief) and The Three Graces (approximate date)
 Giulio Romano – Jonah and the Whale
 Giovanni Battista Piazzetta – Portrait of Sophie Juliane von der Schulenburg
 Lucas van Leyden – Healing the blind men of Jericho
 Bernard van Orley and William Dermoyen – The Battle of Pavia (tapestry, woven between 1528 and 1531)

Births
 Vincenzo Cartari, Italian painter (died 1569)
 Luis de Carbajal, Spanish painter of the Renaissance period (died 1618)
 Lodovico Leoni, Italian painter mainly active in Rome (died 1606)
 (born 1531/1532): Alonso Sánchez Coello, portrait painter of the Spanish Renaissance (died 1588)

Deaths
 Hans Burgkmair, German painter and printmaker in woodcut (born 1473)
 Andrea del Sarto, Italian painter from Florence (born 1486)
 Hans Leu the Younger, Swiss painter (born ca. 1490)
 Girolamo Mocetto, Italian Renaissance painter, engraver, and stained glass designer (born 1470)
 Tilman Riemenschneider, German sculptor and woodcarver (born 1460)

 
Years of the 16th century in art